Dejeania is a genus of tachinid flies in the family Tachinidae.

Species
The following species are recognised in the genus Dejeania:
 Dejeania atrata (Wulp, 1888)
 Dejeania bombylans (Fabricius, 1798)
 Dejeania hecate Karsch, 1886
 Dejeania longirostris Emden, 1960
 Dejeania pertristis Villeneuve, 1913

References

Tachinidae genera